Tritonicula bayeri is a species of dendronotid nudibranch. It is a marine gastropod mollusc in the family Tritoniidae. A number of Caribbean and western Pacific species of Tritonia were moved to a new genus Tritonicula in  2020 as a result of an integrative taxonomic study of the family Tritoniidae.

Distribution
The distribution of Tritonicula bayeri includes Georgia, Florida, Belize, Honduras, Cayman Islands, Virgin Islands, Guadeloupe, Barbados and Panama.

Description
The shape of the body is elongate and narrow. Rhinophoral sheaths are elevated with an irregular edge. Cerata are relatively short and branched. Edge of the oral veil is with relatively long appendages. Rhinophores are long and branched. Background color is translucent gray with a distinctive reticulate network of opaque white across the dorsum. It is up to 11 mm long.

Ecology
Tritonicula bayeri was found on gorgonians and coral rubble in Panama.  It inhabits reefs from 11 m down to 77 m depth. Tritonicula bayeri feeds on the octocorals Briareum asbestinum, Leptogorgia virgulata and Pseudopterogorgia sp.

References
This article incorporates Creative Commons (CC-BY-4.0) text from the reference

External links 
 http://www.seaslugforum.net/tritbaye.htm

Tritoniidae
Gastropods described in 1967
Taxa named by Eveline Du Bois-Reymond Marcus
Taxa named by Ernst Marcus (zoologist)